Dahi Al Naemi (born 5 September 1978) is a Qatari footballer who is a defender for Umm-Salal.

Al Naemi played for Qatar at the 1995 FIFA U-17 World Championship in Ecuador. He subsequently played for the senior national team in FIFA World Cup Qualifiers 1998, 2002 and 2006. 
In 2009, his club Umm-Salal became the first Qatari side in history to reach the semi-finals of the AFC Champions League.

References

External links 
FIFA.com profile
Goalzz.com profile

Qatari footballers
Umm Salal SC players
1978 births
Living people
Qatar Stars League players
Al Sadd SC players
Al-Rayyan SC players
Al-Wakrah SC players
Association football defenders
Qatar international footballers
2000 AFC Asian Cup players